Josette Patricia Simon  is a British actress. She trained for the stage at the Central School of Speech and Drama in London, and played the part of Dayna Mellanby in the third and fourth series of the television sci-fi series Blake's 7 from 1980 to  1981. On stage, she has appeared in Royal Shakespeare Company (RSC) productions from 1982, playing Ariel in The Tempest, to 2018 when she was Cleopatra in Antony and Cleopatra. The first black woman in an RSC play, Simon has been at the forefront of 'colour-blind casting', playing roles traditionally taken by white actresses, including Maggie, a character that is thought to be based on Marilyn Monroe, in Arthur Miller's After the Fall at the National Theatre in 1990.

Her first  leading role at the RSC, the first for a black actress, was as Rosaline, in Love's Labour's Lost, directed by Barry Kyle, in 1984. In 1987, Simon appeared for the RSC again, in the lead role of Isabelle in Measure for Measure. Later leading roles for the RSC saw her as Titania/Hippolyta in A Midsummer Night's Dream (1999–2000) and Cleopatra in Antony And Cleopatra (2017–18). She has played numerous other roles across stage, television, film, and radio.

Simon won the Evening Standard Best Actress award, a Critics' Circle Theatre Award, and Plays and Players Critic Awards for After the Fall, and two film festival awards for her part in Milk and Honey (1988). She was awarded the Order of the British Empire in 2000, for services to drama.

Early life
Josette Patricia Simon was born in 1960 in Leicester. Her mother, from Anguilla, and her father, from Antigua had both moved to Leicester in the 1950s, and worked at Thorn EMI. Simon attended Rushey Mead primary school, followed by Alderman Newton's Girls School. She became interested in acting after successfully auditioning, aged 14, with a friend for the choir for Joseph and the Amazing Technicolor Dreamcoat. Simon later appeared in pantomimes before finishing secondary school, and played Martha in a 1976 production of The Miracle Worker directed by Michael Bogdanov at the Leicester Haymarket Theatre. Alan Rickman, who was in the production of Joseph and the Amazing Technicolor Dreamcoat, encouraged Simon to apply for the Central School of Speech and Drama in London, and she was accepted.

Career

Blake's 7
Simon won the part of Dayna Mellanby in the BBC 1 television sci-fi series Blake's 7 after being  talent-spotted while still at the Central School of Speech and Drama. Simon played Mellanby in the third and fourth series, originally broadcast between January 1980 and December 1981. The character was an expert combatant and highly knowledgeable about weapons.

Royal Shakespeare Company, and Royal National Theatre
Simon has performed frequently with the Royal Shakespeare Company and Royal National Theatre. After taking part in a reading of Salvation Now by Snoo Wilson in 1982, she was cast as one of the three "weird sisters" in Macbeth alongside Kathy Behean and Lesley Sharp later that year. In the same RSC season, she had roles in Much Ado About Nothing, as a spirit in The Tempest and as Iras in Antony And Cleopatra. She was with the RSC for two consecutive two-year season cycles, and in the second cycle her roles included Nerissa in The Merchant Of Venice and starring as Dorcas Ableman in Golden Girls. In 1997 she told academic Alison Oddey that what she learnt from working with Michael Gambon and, particularly, Helen Mirren for Antony And Cleopatra had been an early influence on her career.

Simon was the first black woman to appear in a Shakespeare play at the RSC. She has been at the forefront of 'colour-blind casting', playing roles traditionally taken by white actresses. From the mid-1980s to the late 1990s, a time when it was unusual for black women to feature as leads in leading Shakespeare plays, Simon played several major roles for the RSC. Her first  leading role, and the first for a black actress at the RSC, was as Rosaline, in Love's Labour's Lost, directed by Barry Kyle, in 1984. Jami Rogers, in her book British Black and Asian Shakespeareans (2022) commented that in Kyle's production, where the women were dressed in Belle Époque-style silk dresses, Rosalie's clothing "immediately marked her as a woman of high status ...For the first time on a major British stage, an African-Caribbean woman portrayed an intelligent, witty and strong leading Shakespearean character." Rogers described the reviews of the production as "glowing". She noted that some reviewers and academics "treated Josette Simon's casting ... as a novelty", criticising the description of integrated casting as an "experiment" as "deeply problematic as it infers the practice is an aberration rather than what it was [by 1990], a common practice". Simon told Oddey that , despite being conscious of discussions about whether audiences would accept a black actress as Rosaline, "I also felt that you should be allowed to fail, because if you don't take risks you can't reach higher planes" and that she had focused on her performance rather than debates around her casting, saying that "If I had thought about those things beforehand, I would not have set foot on the stage".

In 1987, Simon appeared for the RSC again, in the lead role of Isabelle in Measure for Measure, directed by Nicholas Hynter. In a review of the Stratford production, Michael Coveney of the Financial Times felt that Simon "fails ... with the full range of the role. Like so many of this season's leading ladies, she is technically underpowered." Irving Wardle wrote in The Times that: 

The play transferred to the Theatre Royal, Newcastle, and then to the Barbican in 1988. Financial Times critic Martin Hoyle wrote of the Barbican production that Simon "has transformed her voice, both timbre and enunciation .... Incisive, vocally varied, though slightly lacking the full weight for the early emotional climaxes, she gives the best performance I have seen from her, dignified and touching." In The Times in 1991, Benedict Nightingale opined that by casting Simon as Isabella and Rosaline, and Hugh Quarshie in other plays, the RSC had been "launching two performers of huge potential".

In 2014, the RSC's Head of Casting, Hannah Miller, explained that the RSC's policy was to select the best actor for the role regardless of factors including gender, race, class, and disability status. Academic Lynette Goddard argued that despite the RSC's inclusive policy, black actresses still had limited opportunities to progress, "which makes Josette Simon's case all the more compelling". Goddard commented that "the more well known Simon became, the less compelled reviewers felt to mention race". Simon told David Jays of The Guardian in 2017 that "I hate the term 'black actor' ... I'm black, which I'm proud of, but it doesn't mean anything. You're an actor, full stop." Colour-blind casting also applied when Simon played Maggie in Arthur Miller's After the Fall at the National Theatre in 1990. The character is thought to have been based on Marilyn Monroe, who was married to Miller. It was a performance that won Simon the Evening Standard'''s Best Actress award, Critics' Circle Theatre Award and Plays and Players Critic Awards. Miller attended rehearsals for two weeks, and Simon told Oddey that, like playing Rosaline, meeting Miller was one of the key moments in her career, and the experience helped her to focus on her work and disregard distractions. Simon portrayed Vittoria in the Royal National Theatre's The White Devil in 1991.

Simon returned to the RSC in 1999 as Queen Elizabeth in Don Carlos. Nightingale described her performance as " vivid and vital". Next, she was Titania/Hippolyta in A Midsummer Night's Dream. The Financial Times reviewer wrote that Simon spoke "Titania's lines with an almost jazz musicality, dances, moves, and stands with compelling power. Her stance alone is more regal than that of several of today's ballerinas." Paul Taylor of The Independent called the production's Nicolas Jones and Simon " the sexiest, most commanding Oberon and Titania of recent years".

In 2017, Simon took the role of Cleopatra in Antony and Cleopatra for the RSC. Michael Billington wrote for The Guardian that "Simon seems born to play Cleopatra and she gives us a hypnotically mercurial figure whose eroticism is expressed through a permanent restlessness", although he felt that Simon employed too many voices in the role. Making a similar criticism about the range of accents used, Ian Shuttleworth of the Financial Times felt that Simon failed  to play to her strengths as an actor, and concluded that "On the occasion of Simon's first RSC appearance this century, she is heartbreaking in all the wrong ways." Ann Treneman of The Times felt that Simon, with a performance that was "quite bonkers" at times, provided the highlight of the show, despite a "lamentable lack of chemistry" between her and Anthony Byrne as Antony.

Other roles
In 1992 Simon was the lead, and sang, in David Zane Mairowitz's play Dictator Gal, broadcast on BBC Radio 3 in 1992. Her character is married to an exiled dictator who is dying in hospital. Simon's character sings a range of songs, including Richard Wagner and Motown compositions in an attempt to revive him.
 Her performance garnered a Prix Futura Award nomination.

Simon's film appearances include the part of Dr. Ramphele in Cry Freedom (1987). She was nominated for a Genie Awards Best Actress award for Milk and Honey (1988), in which she played Joanna, who leaves Jamaica with her child to work as a nanny in Toronto. Rick Groen of The Globe and Mail wrote that Simons "riveting performance ... carries the picture" for the first part, but felt that from the second act onward, the film descended into histrionics. In the San Francisco Chronicle, Judy Stone praised Simon's performance as Joanna, commenting that "she displays a quality of grace all too rare in today's films".

The 1992 television play Bitter Harvest had Simon in the lead role, as a woman who has gone missing after travelling to the Dominican Republic as an aid worker and whose parents go there in search of her. Academic Claire Tylee considered that Simon's character was a "credible protagonist", the film was adversely affected by a mismatch between the thriller plotline from the production's originator Charles Pattinson and the thread about tensions in a mixed race family introduced by Winsome Pinnock, who has joined the project after Simon had already accepted the leading role based on a plot outline by Pattinson. According to Tylee, neither Simon's character or the character of her father "sufficiently resembles the usual hero of a thriller to successfully play on thriller conventions, and the plots end by humiliating both of them, fetishising the black female body along the way."

In 1993, Simon starred alongside Brenda Fricker in the two-part television series Seekers, written by Lynda La Plante. Their characters discover that they are both married to the same man, who has now disappeared. They later work as partners in the detective agency that he had founded. Lynda Gilbey of Sunday Life wrote that the show was "a first class detective drama ... beautifully plotted, wonderfully performed". The Newcastle Journal reviewer Norman Davison commented that the two lead actresses "invested the roles with the sort of power that all La Plante women seem to have and the men were all the wimps".

Benedict Nightingale of The Times wrote in a negative review of Jean Genet's play The Maids in 1997 that Simon provided the "one strong performance". She had a recurring role in Anatomy of a Scandal in 2022. Simon has played senior police officers in Silent Witness (1998), Minder (2009), and Broadchurch (2017), and has been cast as Chief Commissioner Camberwell in the Anansi Boys'', which was in production as of May 2022.

Personal life
Simon visits patients, with her dog Milo, through the charity Pets As Therapy, and supports the Kaos Signing Choir for Deaf and Hearing Children. She is a patron of Action Deafness, the Life and Deaf Association, the Deaf Ethnic Women's Association, and Safety Curtain.

Simon married tenor Mark Padmore; the couple had one daughter together but are now divorced.

Honours and awards
In 1995, Simon was awarded an honorary Master of Arts degree by the University of Leicester. In the 2000 Birthday Honours she was appointed an Officer of the Order of the British Empire (OBE), for services to drama. She received a Pioneers and Achievers award in 1998, in recognition of being one of the people from Leicester who had "paved the way for the next generations of African Caribbean people to achieve and excel in a diverse range of professions and spheres of influence".

Filmography

Television and streaming
Channels and dates are for the United Kingdom unless otherwise indicated.

Theatre

Radio

Film

Notes

References

External links

RSC Performance Database: Josette Simon 
Interview in the Leicester Mercury

 

British stage actresses
British television actresses
Black British actresses
Officers of the Order of the British Empire
Alumni of the Royal Central School of Speech and Drama
Living people
English people of Antigua and Barbuda descent
People from Leicester
Actresses from Leicestershire
People associated with the University of Leicester
1960 births